Zeesse is a hamlet in the Dutch province of Overijssel. It is a part of the municipality of Ommen, and lies about 23 km east of Zwolle.

It was first mentioned between 1381 and 1383 as "to Zese". The etymology is unclear. The postal authorities have placed it under Ommen. In 1840, it had a population of 154 people, but was probably a larger area than the current definition.

References

Populated places in Overijssel
Ommen